The 2008 Atlantic Sun Conference baseball tournament was held at Melching Field at Conrad Park on the campus of Stetson University in DeLand, Florida, from May 21 through 25. Lipscomb won its first tournament championship to earn the Atlantic Sun Conference's automatic bid to the 2008 NCAA Division I baseball tournament. Lipscomb joined the conference prior to the 2004 season.

Seeding 
The top six teams (based on conference results) from the conference earn invites to the tournament. Florida Gulf Coast, Kennesaw State, North Florida, and South Carolina Upstate were ineligible for the tournament due to NCAA rules after reclassifying to Division I.

Results 

* - Indicates game required 10 innings. † - Indicates game required 15 innings.

All-Tournament Team 
The following players were named to the All-Tournament Team.

Tournament Most Valuable Player 
Caleb Joseph was named Tournament Most Valuable Player. Joseph was a catcher for Lipscomb.

References 

Tournament
ASUN Conference Baseball Tournament
Atlantic Sun baseball tournament
Atlantic Sun baseball tournament